The Al-Muktafi Billah Shah Mosque (Malay: Masjid Al-Muktafi Billah Shah or Masjid Ladang) is the modern royal mosque of Terengganu, Malaysia. It is located at Kampung Ladang, Kuala Terengganu. Construction of the mosque began in 1981 and the mosque was completed in 1984. The mosque was officially opened in September 1984 by the late Sultan of Terengganu Almarhum Sultan Mahmud Al-Muktafi Billah Shah. The new Royal Mausoleum is a short distance from the mosque.

Terengganu Royal Mausoleum

Sultan
Sultan Mahmud Al-Muktafi Billah Shah ibni Almarhum Sultan Ismail Nasiruddin Shah (died 1998)

Tengku Ampuan Besar
Tengku Ampuan Bariah binti Almarhum Sultan Salahuddin Abdul Aziz Shah (died 2011)

Other royal families
Tengku Farah Quraisyiah Puteri binti Almarhum Sultan Mahmud Al-Muktafi Billah Shah (died 2001)

See also
 Islam in Malaysia
 GoogleMaps StreetView of Masjid Al-Muktafi Billah Shah, Kuala Terengganu.

References

Mosques in Terengganu
Mausoleums in Malaysia
1984 establishments in Malaysia
Mosques completed in 1984
Mosque buildings with domes